Eleni is a feminine given name of Greek origin. It is a phonetic spelling of the Modern Greek name "Ελένη", whose ancient version, Ἑλένη, is anglicized as Helen. Popular diminutives and nicknames include: Elenitsa, Elenaki, Elena, Lena, Lenio, Lenners, Nitsa.

Eleni may refer to:

People 
Eleni of Ethiopia (died 1522), Ethiopian empress
Eleni Andriola (born 1986), Greek gymnast
Eleni Artymata (born 1986), Greek sprinter
Eleni Avlonitou (born 1958), Greek swimmer
Eleni Bakopanos (born 1954), Greek-born Canadian politician
Eleni Benson (born 1983), Greek footballer
Eleni Christofi (born 1998), Greek tennis player
Eleni Cubitt, Greek-born British film maker
Eleni Daniilidou (born 1982), Greek tennis player
Eleni Doika (born 1995), Greek gymnast
Eleni Donta (born 1980), Greek marathon runner
Eleni Fotiadou Küreman (1921–2001), Turkish photojournalist of Greek ethnicity
Eleni Foureira (born 1987), Greek singer and fashion designer
Eleni Goula (born 1990), Greek water polo player
Eleni Kapogianni (born 1969), Greek basketball coach
Eleni Karaindrou, Greek composer
Eleni Kounalakis, 50th Lieutenant Governor of California
Eleni Konsolaki, Greek archaeologist
Eleni Kosti (born 1985), Greek swimmer
Eleni Kouvdou (born 1989), Greek water polo player
Eleni Lambiri (born 1889), Greek conductor and composer
Eleni Mandell (born 1969), American singer-songwriter
Eleni Markou (born 1995), Greek footballer
Eleni Mavrou (born 1961), Greek Cypriot politician
Eleni Memetzi (born 1975), Greek volleyball player
Eleni Menegaki (born 1969), Greek talk show presenter
Eleni Oikonomopoulou (1912–1999), Greek artist
Eleni Ourani (1896–1971), Greek writer
Eleni Papadaki (1903–1944), Greek stage actress
Eleni Patsiou (born 1971), Greek judoka
Eleni Poimenidou (born 1980), Greek handball player
Eleni Rantou (born 1963), Greek actress
Eleni Skoura (1896-1991), Greek politician
Eleni Stroulia, Greek-Canadian computer scientist
Eleni Tampasi (born 1976), Greek judoka
Eleni Teloni (born 1964), Cypriot hammer thrower
Eleni Tsakopoulos Kounalakis, American diplomat
Eleni Tsaligopoulou (born 1963), Greek singer
Eleni Tzoka (born 1956), Polish singer
Eleni Vakalo (1921-2001), Greek poet, art critic and art historian
Eleni Vasileiou (born 1974), Greek basketball player
Eleni Vitali (born 1954), Greek singer
Eleni Xenaki (born 1997), Greek water polo player
Eleni Zafeiriou (1916–2004), Greek film actress

Fictional characters 
Eleni Andros Cooper, fictional character on the soap opera Guiding Light
Eleni, fictional vampire in Anne Rice's novel The Vampire Lestat
Eleni Petraki, fictional character in Victoria Hislop's novel The Island
Eleni Cooper, mother of Baron George Cooper in the Legends of Tortall novels by Tamora Pierce

Songs about Eleni 
"Anoixe Lenio tin porta" (Lenio open the door, Greek: Άνοιξε Λενιώ την πόρτα), traditional
"Eleni" by Thanos Mikroutsikos and Babis Tsikliropoulos, originally sung by Haris Alexiou
"Fevgo, Lenio" (Lenio, I'm leaving, Greek: Φεύγω, Λενιώ) by Spyros Peristeris and Minos Matsas
"I Eleni i zontochira" (Divorcee Eleni, Greek: Η Ελένη η ζωντοχήρα) by Iovan Tsaous, originally sung by Antonis Kalyvopoulos
"I Lenio i koutsobola" (Nosy Lenio, Greek: Η Λενιώ η κουτσομπόλα) by Michalis Genitsaris
"Nitsa-Elenitsa" (Greek: Νίτσα-Ελενίτσα) by Giorgos Mitsakis, originally sung by Stelios Kazantzidis
"To tango tis Elenis" (Eleni's tango, Greek: Το τανγκό της Ελένης) by Antonis Vardis and Vasilis Papakonstantinou
"Eleni" by Nikos Karvelas, originally sung by Anna Vissi - later covered by Turkish pop folk singer Hülya Avşar as "Sevdim"

See also
Elaine (disambiguation)
Elena (disambiguation)
 Eleni (disambiguation)
Ellen (disambiguation)
Helen (disambiguation)
Helen (given name)
Helena (disambiguation)
Helene (disambiguation)

Greek feminine given names
Given names of Greek language origin